Lake Mackintosh is a  reservoir with a surface area of  that forms part of the Pieman power development running north–south past Mount Farrell, adjacent to the town of Tullah in Tasmania.

Features
Fed by the damming of the Mackintosh, Sophia, Fury, Southwell, and Brougham rivers and Mackintosh Creek, water from the lake feeds Mackintosh Power Station through Lake Rosebery.

The lake was created in the 1980s and the main basin of the lake was originally a Button Grass swamp prior to inundation.

Lake Mackintosh is impounded by two dams, the main Mackintosh Dam and the smaller Tullabardine Dam. It is one of the larger sized water impoundments of the Pieman power scheme.

The Murchison River feeds into Lake Mackintosh through the Murchison Dam, to the south. The Murchison Highway borders the lake to the west.

The Cradle Mountain-Lake St Clair National Park as a component part of the Tasmanian Wilderness World Heritage Area, has its western boundary lying to the east of the lake shores.

See also

List of reservoirs and dams in Tasmania
List of lakes in Tasmania

References

Mackintosh
West Coast Range
Pieman River Power Development